Matteo Marconcini (born 26 August 1989) is an Italian judoka. He competed at the 2016 Summer Olympics in the 81 kg category, and lost the bronze medal match to Sergiu Toma.

Marconcini is an athlete of the Centro Sportivo Carabinieri.

References

External links

 
 

1989 births
Living people
Italian male judoka
Judoka at the 2016 Summer Olympics
Olympic judoka of Italy
Sportspeople from Arezzo
Judoka of Centro Sportivo Carabinieri
20th-century Italian people
21st-century Italian people